Sevel S.p.A. (acronym of "Società Europea Veicoli Leggeri" - "Société Européenne de Véhicules Légers" (European Light Vehicle Company)) is an Italian automotive company which produces light commercial vehicles. It was first established in 1978 by Fiat S.p.A. and PSA Group. Formerly, Alfa Romeo, Lancia and Talbot were also part of the joint venture. Sevel Sud in Italy began manufacturing in 1981. Sevel Nord in France started in 1993. Fiat sold its share of Sevel Nord to PSA in 2012 and re-entered it through the merger of FCA and PSA into Stellantis in 2021. A joint venture extension for Sevel Sud was agreed upon by both automakers in February 2019, preceding the merger of both companies into Stellantis.

The versatile acronym was also used by Fiat and Peugeot's Argentinian subsidiary since December 1980, and later also in Uruguay. Here, however, the abbreviation signified "Sociedad Europea de Vehículos para Latinoamérica" (European Company for making Vehicles for Latin America).

Sevel Nord 
"Sevel Nord" (from "Société Européenne de Véhicules Légers") is a car factory in Lieu-Saint-Amand, near Valenciennes, Denain and Cambrai, France, with manufacturing commencing in 1993. It was founded as a 50-50 joint venture between Groupe PSA (then named PSA Peugeot Citroën) and Fiat. Sevel Nord started manufacturing vans for Toyota in 2013. A third generation of light commercial vans and passenger minivans was launched by PSA and Fiat in 2016.

It has a production capacity of 200,000 vehicles per year, and a total of 2,400 employees. In 2011 some 94,000 vans were manufactured, 74,000 of which were Peugeot and Citroën and 20,000 were Fiat models.

Sevel Nord has produced:
 Minivans/MPVs nicknamed Eurovans (1994–2014): Citroën Synergie/Evasion, Fiat Ulysse, Lancia Zeta/Phedra, Peugeot 806/807.
 Third generation minivans (2016–present)
 Citroën Space Tourer
 Fiat Ulysse
 Peugeot Traveller
 Toyota ProAce Verso
 Opel Zafira Life/ Vauxhall Vivaro Life
 Light commercial vehicles
 Citroën Jumpy/Dispatch
 Fiat Scudo (1994–2015, 2022-present)
 Peugeot Expert
 Toyota ProAce (2013–present)
 Opel Vivaro/ Vauxhall Vivaro

Sevel Sud

Sevel Atessa
The Sevel Sud (from Società Europea Veicoli Leggeri") is a car factory in Atessa, Italy. The complex is owned by Stellantis. The factory began manufacturing in 1981.

It occupies an area of more than 1.2 million square meters, of which 344,000 are covered. It has a production capacity of 250,000 vehicles per year, with a total of 6,300 workers employed. In 2013, Fiat and PSA announced their new investment for a new generation van, with a €550 million/€150 million split in investment, with the joint venture continuing through their merger company Stellantis. The facelifted third generation model was launched in 2014.

In September 2018 the 6 millionth vehicle (a Fiat Ducato) was built in the Sevel Atessa factory.

 First generation (1981–1994)
 Fiat Ducato
 Alfa Romeo AR6
 Peugeot J5
 Citroën C25
 Talbot Express
 Second generation (1993–2006)
 Fiat Ducato
 Peugeot Boxer
 Citroën Jumper/Relay
 Third generation (X250; 2006–present)
 Fiat Ducato
 Peugeot Boxer
 Citroën Jumper/Relay
 Opel Movano/ Vauxhall Movano

Production by model between 2000 and 2007 in the Sevel Sud factory:

Source OICA.

Note: The Fiat Ducato is also manufactured in Brazil (6,000 ex per year) and in Russia (15,000 ex per year since 2007).

Sevel Campania
The Sevel Campania S.p.A. is the second factory of Sevel Sud located in Pomigliano d'Arco, near Naples. The factory produced the Fiat Ducato and Talento and the rebadged Alfa Romeo AR6 until 1994 when it was discontinued.

Sevel Latin America

The Sevel acronym was also used by Fiat and Peugeot's Argentinian subsidiary after they merged in December 1980. Here, however, the abbreviation signified Sociedad Europea de Vehículos para Latinoamérica (European Company for making Vehicles for Latin America). There was also a Sevel plant in Montevideo, Uruguay.

Timeline

References 

Stellantis
Motor vehicle assembly plants in France
Motor vehicle assembly plants in Italy
Abruzzo
Italian companies established in 1978